Liliane Rovère (born 30 January 1933) is a French actress.

Personal life
Liliane Rovère was born Liliane Cyprienne Cukier. Of Jewish origin, she had to hide in Catholic institutions under a fake name during the German occupation of France in World War II. Her parents survived the Holocaust, but many of her family did not.

Rovère's lifelong love of jazz began at age 12, and from then on she frequented jazz clubs. At age 18, after a visit to the Club Saint-Germain, Rovère survived a rape by two acquaintances.

In 1954, Rovère's parents sent her to live with an uncle in the United States. She visited Birdland in New York City, where she met cool jazz trumpeter Chet Baker at the height of his fame. They began a romantic relationship. She lived with Baker and accompanied him on tour for two years, and he introduced her as his wife despite his existing marriage. The stylish couple was frequently photographed together, including in a famous shot by William Claxton where she, with a curly pixie cut and black dress, gazes at the viewer while resting her hand on Baker's head; it appears as part of a collage on the cover of Chet Baker Sings and Plays. While on tour, Rovère caused a stir when she openly palled around with Black people in racially segregated St. Louis. Baker and Rovère's romance ended in 1956, when Baker informed her by mail that he'd married a new woman.

A few years later, Rovère married jazz bassist . In 1971, they adopted a daughter that they named Tina.

After taking acting classses, Rovère began appearing as supporting characters on television. She works as a make-up artist in cinema and television.

In 1986, Rovère appeared as Madame Queen in Round Midnight, a film which features roles and cameos played by real-life jazz figures and stars bebop saxophonist Dexter Gordon.

In 1998, Rovère received a Lutin, an award given to short films, for best actress in Christian Rouaud's Le Sujet.

In 2015, Rovère appeared as Arlette Azémar, a main character in Call My Agent!. Some of the character's elements, such as a passion for jazz and a youthful romance with Chet Baker, are taken from Rovère's life.

Rovère published an autobiography in 2019 titled La folle vie de Lili.

In 2022, she supports the candidacy of Jean-Luc Mélenchon for the French presidential election.

Filmography

Theatre

References

External links

French film actresses
20th-century French actresses
21st-century French actresses
Actresses from Paris
Living people
1933 births
French stage actresses
French television actresses
Jewish French actresses